Hendersonville Memory Gardens is a cemetery located at 353 East Main Street in Hendersonville, Tennessee, United States, a few miles northeast of Nashville. Formerly known as Woodlawn Memorial Park East, it is the burial site of Johnny Cash as well as several members of the Carter Family of musicians, and numerous other stars from the world of country music.

Notable interments
 Max D. Barnes (1936–2004), songwriter
 "Mother" Maybelle Carter (1909–1978), musician, singer, songwriter, member of the Original Carter Family
 Helen Carter (1927–1998), country singer-musician and eldest daughter of Maybelle Carter
 Anita Carter (1933–1999), singer-musician and daughter of Maybelle Carter
 Johnny Cash (1932–2003), country music singer-songwriter
 June Carter Cash (1929–2003), country music singer
 Rosie Nix Adams (1958–2003), singer-songwriter and daughter of June Carter Cash
 Ferlin Husky (1925–2011), country music singer
 Merle Kilgore (1934–2005), country music singer-songwriter
 Joe Maphis (1921–1986), country music master guitarist
 Luther Perkins (1928–1968), country music guitarist for Johnny Cash
 Sheb Wooley (1921–2003), actor and singer-songwriter

See also
 List of United States cemeteries

External links
 Henderson Memory Gardens at Find a Grave

Cemeteries in Tennessee
Protected areas of Sumner County, Tennessee